Micajah "Big" Harpe, born Joshua Harper (before 1768 – August 24, 1799), and Wiley "Little" Harpe, born William Harper (before 1770 – February 8, 1804), were murderers, highwaymen and river pirates who operated in Tennessee, Kentucky, Illinois and Mississippi in the late 18th century. They are often considered the earliest documented serial killers in the United States history.

Loyal to the British Crown during the American Revolution, the Harpes became outlaws after the war and began robbing and killing settlers in the remote frontier west of the Appalachian Mountains. They are believed to have killed 39 people, and possibly as many as 50. As the Harpes' crimes gained notoriety, vigilante groups formed to avenge their victims, and they were eventually tracked down and executed around the turn of the century. Their savagery has since entered American folklore, appearing to have been motivated more by blood lust than financial gain.

Early life

Historians note the difficulty of differentiating the facts about the Harpe brothers from the later legends of their exploits, as there are few certain records of their lives from the time period. They are believed to have been born in what is now Orange County, North Carolina to Scottish parents. Micajah was probably born in or before 1768 as Joshua Harper, and Wiley in or before 1770 as William Harper.

Though many historical accounts identify them as brothers, it is also possible they were first cousins named Joshua and William Harper who emigrated from Scotland in 1759 or 1760. According to this theory, their fathers were brothers, John and William Harper, who settled in Orange County, North Carolina, between 1761 and 1763. Like many Scottish settlers of the American colonies, the Harpers were Calvinists and avowed Tories loyal to the king.

Prior to the American Revolution, Big and Little Harpe's fathers may also have served in Tory militias in the War of the Regulation or "Regulator War" of 1765–1771, during which colonists in the Carolinas took up arms against the continuing royal government interference by British colonial officials. When the Revolutionary War began, the Harpes' fathers tried to join the Patriot American forces but were refused because of their earlier associations with British loyalists. The treatment of the Harpe family by hostile Patriot neighbors may have contributed to Big and Little Harpe's feelings of persecution and their desire for revenge against people they considered rebellious traitors who were still the British subjects of King George III.

Around April or May 1775, the young Harpes left North Carolina and went to Virginia to find overseer jobs on a slave plantation. Big Harpe later traveled in the company of two women, Susan and Betsey/Betty Roberts, possibly sisters, both of whom bore him children. Little Harpe married Sarah "Sally" Rice, the daughter of a Baptist minister.

Involvement in American Revolutionary War and American Indian Wars

Little is known of the Harpes' precise whereabouts at the outbreak of the American Revolution. According to the eyewitness account of Captain James Wood of the Continental Army, they joined a Tory 
"rape gang" in North Carolina. These predatory Loyalist criminals took advantage of wartime lawlessness by raping, stealing, murdering and burning and destroying property, especially the farms of Patriot colonists.

The Harpes' gang took part in the kidnapping of three teenage girls, with a fourth girl being rescued by a Captain Wood. The Harpes also served as military associators, who were not provided soldiers' uniforms, weapons, and pay by the British government. Like many other Loyalist volunteers, they survived by foraging, robbery, and the looting of battlefields.

Captain Wood's son was Frank Wood, a Patriot soldier of the frontier Overmountain Men and the older brother of Susan Wood, who was later kidnapped and made the wife of Micajah Harpe. Frank Wood claimed to have seen the Harpe brothers, serving "loosely" as Tory militia, at the Battle of Kings Mountain in October 1780, under British commander Major Patrick Ferguson. During the three-hour engagement, Wood took aim at Big Harpe but missed his target. Later, the Harpes served under the command of Lieutenant Colonel Banastre Tarleton's British Legion at the Battles of Blackstocks in November 1780 and Cowpens in January 1781.

Following the decisive British defeat by Patriot and French forces at Yorktown in 1781, the Harpes left North Carolina, dispersing with their Indian allies, the renegade Chickamauga Cherokee, to Tennessee villages west of the Appalachian Mountains. On April 2, 1781, they joined war parties of four hundred Chickamauga to attack the Patriot frontier settlement of Bluff Station at Fort Nashborough (present-day Nashville, Tennessee), which would be assaulted by them again on either July 20, 1788, or April 9, 1793. On August 19, 1782, the Harpes accompanied a British-backed Chickamauga Cherokee war party to Kentucky at the Battle of Blue Licks, where they helped to defeat an army of Patriot frontiersmen led by Daniel Boone.

During the Harpes' early frontier period among the Chickamauga Cherokee, they lived in the village of Nickajack, near Chattanooga, Tennessee, for approximately twelve or thirteen years. During this time, they kidnapped Maria Davidson and later Susan Wood. In 1794, the Harpes abandoned their Indian habitation before Nickajack was destroyed in a raid by American militia. The Harpe brothers would later relocate to Powell's Valley, around Knoxville, Tennessee, where they stole food and supplies from local pioneers. They may have disguised their Tory past from their Patriot neighbors by changing their original name of "Harper", which was a common Loyalist surname in Revolutionary War-era North Carolina.

The whereabouts of the Harpes are unknown after the summer of 1795, but by the spring of 1797 they were apparently dwelling in a cabin on Beaver's Creek near Knoxville. On June 1, 1797, Wiley Harpe married Sarah Rice, which was recorded in the Knox County marriage records.

Serial murders and atrocities
Sometime during 1797, the Harpes began a vicious crime spree through Tennessee, Kentucky, and Illinois. The Harpes later confessed to the killings of a confirmed thirty-nine people, but the estimated combined total, including unknown victims, may number more than fifty. What follows are the accounts of a few of the murders the two committed.

In 1797, while the Harpes were living near Knoxville, Tennessee, they were driven from the town after being charged with stealing hogs and horses. They were also accused of murdering a man named Johnson, whose body was found in a river, covered in urine and ripped open, with the chest cavity filled and weighted down with stones. This became a signature corpse-disposal method of the Harpes' serial killings. They reportedly butchered anyone at the slightest provocation. They even murdered babies.

From Knoxville, the Harpes fled north into Kentucky. They entered the state on the Wilderness Road near the Cumberland Gap. They are believed to have murdered a peddler named Peyton, taking his horse and some of his goods. In December, they murdered two travelers from Maryland. Next, a man named John Langford, who was traveling from Virginia to Kentucky, turned up dead and a local innkeeper pointed the authorities to the Harpes. The criminal pair was pursued, captured, and jailed in the state prison in Danville, Kentucky, but they managed to escape. When a posse was sent after them, the young son of a man who assisted the authorities was found dead and mutilated by the Harpes in retaliation.

On April 22, 1799, Kentucky Governor James Garrard placed a $300 reward on each of the Harpes' heads. Fleeing northward, the Harpes killed two men named Edmonton and Stump. When they were near the mouth of the Saline River in southern Illinois, they came upon three men encamped there and killed them. The pair then made their way to Cave-In-Rock, a natural cave on the bluffs above the Illinois bank of the Ohio River and a stronghold of the river pirate and criminal gang leader Samuel Mason. A posse had been aggressively pursuing them but stopped just short of the cave on the opposite shore in Kentucky.
 
With their wives and three children in tow, the Harpes holed up with the Samuel Mason Gang, who preyed on slow-moving flatboats making their way along the Ohio River. While the Mason Gang could be ruthless, even they were appalled at the actions of the Harpes. After the murderous pair began to make a habit of taking travelers to the top of the bluff, stripping them naked, and pushing them off, Samuel Mason forced the Harpe brothers to leave.
 
The Harpes then returned to eastern Tennessee, where they continued their vicious murder spree. They killed a farmer named Bradbury, a man named Hardin, and a boy named Coffey in July 1798. Soon more bodies were discovered, including those of William Ballard, who had been disemboweled and thrown in the Holston River; James Brassel, who had his throat viciously slashed and was discovered on Brassel's Knob; and John Tully. John Graves and his teenage son were found dead with their heads axed in south-central Kentucky. In Logan County, the Harpes killed a little girl, a young slave, and an entire family they found asleep in their camp.

In August 1799, a few miles northeast of Russellville, Kentucky, Big Harpe bashed his infant daughter's head against a tree because her constant crying annoyed him, the only crime for which he would later confess genuine remorse. That same month, a man named Trowbridge was found disemboweled in Highland Creek. When the Harpes were given shelter at the Stegall home in Webster County, the pair killed an overnight guest named Major William Love, as well as Mrs. Moses Stegall's four-month-old baby boy, whose throat was slit when he cried. When Mrs. Stegall screamed at the sight of her infant being killed, she was also murdered.

Physical appearances
The second Governor of Kentucky, James Garrard, issued a government proclamation on April 22, 1799, in the name of the Commonwealth of Kentucky declaring a $300 reward for their apprehension and deliverance back to Danville, Kentucky for trial. Governor Garrard gave a description of the physical appearances of the Harpe brothers:

MICAJAH HARP alias ROBERTS is about six feet high-of robust make, and is about 30 or 32 years of age. He has an ill-looking, downcast countenance, and his hair is black and short, but comes very much down his forehead. He is built very straight and is full fleshed in the face. When he went away he had on a striped nankeen coat, dark blue woolen stockings,-leggins of drab cloth and trousers of the same as the coat.

WILEY HARP alias ROBERTS is very meagre in his face, has short black hair but not quite so curly as his brother's; he looks older, though really younger, and has likewise a downcast countenance. He had on a coat of the same stuff as his brother's, and had a surtout coat over the close-bodied one. His stockingsdark woolen ones, and his leggins of drab cloth.

Deaths

The Harpe killings continued in July 1799 as the two fled west to avoid a new posse, organized by John Leiper, which included the avenging husband and father Moses Stegall. While the pair was preparing to kill another settler named George Smith, the posse finally tracked them down on August 24, 1799. The posse called for the Harpes to surrender; they attempted to flee. Micajah Harpe was shot in the leg and back by Leiper, who soon caught up with him and pulled him from his horse, subduing the outlaw with a tomahawk in a scuffle.

As he lay dying, Micajah Harpe confessed to twenty murders. While Harpe was still conscious, Moses Stegall slowly cut off the outlaw's head. Later, the head was spiked on a pole (some accounts claim a tree) at a crossroads near the Moses Stegall Cabin that is still known as "Harpe's Head" or "Harpe's Head Road" along a modern-day highway in Webster County, Kentucky.

Wiley Harpe successfully escaped the confrontation and rejoined the Mason Gang pirates at Cave-In-Rock. Four years later, Wiley Harpe might have been captured along with the rest of the gang but went unrecognized because he was using the alias of "John Setton" or "John Sutton". Both Harpe and Samuel Mason, the gang leader, escaped, but Mason was shot. Afterwards, Little Harpe and another gang member, Peter Alston (who went by the name "James May"), son of the counterfeiter Philip Alston, tried to claim the bounty on Samuel Mason, although it is unclear whether Mason died from the wounds sustained during the escape or whether Harpe killed him.

Regardless, as they presented Mason's head, a Kentuckian recognized Harpe and Alston as outlaws themselves and the two men were arrested. The two soon escaped but were quickly recaptured, tried, and sentenced to be hanged. In January 1804, Wiley Harpe and Peter Alston were executed by hanging. Their heads were cut off and placed high on stakes along the Natchez Trace as a warning to other outlaws.

Harpe women

According to Jon Musgrave, the Harpe women, after being freed from cohabitation with the brothers, led relatively respectable and normal lives. Upon the death of Micajah "Big" Harpe in Kentucky, the women were apprehended and taken to the Russellville, Kentucky state courthouse but later released. Sally Rice Harpe went back to Knoxville, Tennessee, to live in her father's house. For a time, Susan Wood and Maria Davidson (a.k.a. Betsey Roberts) lived in Russellville. Susan Wood remarried later, and died in Tennessee. Her daughter went to Texas.

On September 27, 1803, Betsey Roberts married John Huffstutler and the couple lived as tenants on Colonel Butlers Plantation. They moved to Hamilton County, Illinois in 1828, and had many children; the couple eventually died in the 1860s. In 1820, Sally Rice, who had remarried, traveled with her husband and father to their new home in Illinois via the Cave-In-Rock Ferry.

In popular culture

In the 1941 film The Devil and Daniel Webster (or All That Money Can Buy), Big and Little Harpe are part of the "jury of the damned" that Daniel Webster must convince in order to free an innocent Jabez Stone.

In the 1956 Walt Disney television series Davy Crockett and the River Pirates,  the Harpe brothers are portrayed by American actors Paul Newlan as Big Harpe and Frank Richards as Little Harpe.

The 1975 Broadway musical The Robber Bridegroom featured two characters (Big Harp and Little Harp) based on the Harpes. Big Harp is presented as a "cut off head" in a trunk, rescued by his brother when he was put to death for thieving. He's also the smarter of the two brothers.

The Harpe brothers were the inspiration for Big and Little Drum in Lois McMaster Bujold's 2008 novel Passage, part of The Sharing Knife series. Wiley Harpe is also the subject of a song on Bob Frank and John Murry's 2006 album World Without End.

In 2015, the Investigation Discovery television channel series Evil Kin aired an episode about the Harpe brothers called "Something Wicked in the Woods".

A short narrative of the Harpe brothers' lives appears in Selah Saterstrom's 2015 novel Slab. Tiger, the novel's main character, grows up with her family near the Mississippi River on the land of Wiley Harpe's estate off the Natchez Trace where Wiley Harpe "would dismember the corpses and make arrangements from their parts, ornamenting the land around his humble plantation". Tiger's grandfather installs a tire swing on a tree, to which he also affixes "a historical plaque: LITTLE HARPE HANGED HERE".

See also 
 List of serial killers in the United States

References

Coates, Robert M. The Outlaw Years: the History of the Land Pirates of the Natchez Trace. 1930.
Gordon, Maj. Maurice Kirby. History of Hopkins County, Kentucky, published by the Hopkins County Genealogical Society.
Hall, James. The Harpe's Head: A Legend of Kentucky. New York: Key & Biddle, 1833.
Magee, M. Juliette. Cavern of crime. Livingston Ledger, 1973.
McDowell, Gary D. and Ruth A. McDowell. Mississippi Secrets: Facts, Legends, and Folklore. Bloomington, IN: iUniverse, 2007.
Musgrave, Jon. "Frontier serial killers: The Harpes". American Weekend, The Daily Register, Harrisburg, IL. October 23, 1998.

Rothert, Otto A. The Outlaws of Cave-In-Rock. Cleveland 1924; rpt. 1996.
Smith, Carter F. Gangs and the Military: Gangsters, Bikers, and Terrorists with Military Training. Lanham, MD: Rowman & Littlefield, 2017.
Thrapp, Dan L. Encyclopedia of frontier biography, Volume 4. Arthur H. Clark Co., 1988.
Ward, Harry M. Between the Lines: Banditti of the American Revolution. Santa Barbara, CA: Praeger, 2002.

External links
Frontier serial killers: The Harpes, Southern Illinois History Page
Outlaws of Cave-In-Rock, Southern Illinois History Page
A Bloody Legend, Sketch of Big and Little Harpe, Henderson County, Kentucky
The Vicious Harpes - First American Serial Killers, Old West Legends
The Harpes: America's 1st Serial Killers,? The Butcher's Floor
 "Fearsome twosome had a reign of terror in these parts," Henderson (Kentucky) Gleaner, March 27, 1988
 "Big Harpe and Little Harpe," Murder by Gaslight, October 24, 2010

1804 murders in the United States
18th-century American criminals
18th-century pirates
19th-century pirates
19th-century American criminals
American highwaymen
American outlaws
American people of Scottish descent
American pirates
American serial killers
Brother duos
Criminal duos
Criminals from Kentucky
Criminals from North Carolina
History of Kentucky
History of Tennessee
Loyalists in the American Revolution from North Carolina
Male serial killers
People from Orange County, North Carolina
People of pre-statehood Illinois